Brendan Richard Lewis is an Irish author and blogger who defines himself as a "technomad language hacker". He is best known for his website Fluent in 3 Months, on which he documents personal attempts to learn languages within short time periods, typically three months.

Lewis is the author of the book Fluent in 3 Months (2014) as well as a language courses series titled Language Hacking, including Spanish, French, German, and Italian.

Early life 
Born in Ireland, Lewis has described himself as mediocre in languages at school, getting a C in German and just managing to pass his Irish language exams. He graduated in electronic engineering from University College Dublin and then spent time struggling to learn Spanish in Spain, where it  took him over a year to learn the language. His frustration with conventional methods led him to take a different approach to language learning, as described in his book and website Fluent in 3 Months.

Career 
Lewis is the founder and CEO of the website Fluent in 3 Months.

He has given two talks on TEDx. In 2013, he was named a Traveler of the Year by National Geographic magazine.

He has authored five books, including Fluent in 3 Months (2014), as well as four course books written in collaboration with Teach Yourself: Language Hacking Spanish, Language Hacking French, Language Hacking German, and Language Hacking Italian. He has also coached and given private language lessons by telephone and Skype.

Language learning approach 
Lewis claims that anyone can learn a language to fluency in as little as three months. Lewis understands fluency as "social equivalency", meaning that he "can function in social situations pretty much the same in [his] target language as [he] would in [his] native one". His approach is to start speaking a new language from the very first day, ignoring mistakes and using very basic language like "me want go supermarket."

Lewis explains the name of his business Fluent in 3 Months as follows:

Lewis suggests that American entrepreneurs learn foreign languages and notes that "In Ireland, we grow up hearing a range of Englishes".

Language learning projects 
To date, Lewis has documented attempts to learn over 20 languages to varying degrees of fluency over short time periods—typically three months—some successful, some not. He publicly shares his experiences on his website with a combination of blog posts and YouTube video footage. He started recording his efforts in 2009 partly to prove it was possible to learn a language fluently in three months.

His claims have been met with some scepticism. Noted polyglots like Steve Kaufmann have looked at his results and noted it is largely not possible to become fluent in a new language in such a short time. Other research indicates that a realistic time to learn languages such as English or French, without immersion, is 8 months as a minimum, depending on a number of variables.

Czech (2009) 
On the 1 June 2009, Lewis launched the Fluent in 3 Months blog with a post announcing he would learn "fluent" Czech within 3 months. After his 3-month mission, he expected to be able to:

After 3 months, on the 1st of  September 2009, Lewis stated that he had studied Czech for "two months" with a "casual part-time commitment" due to an increased workload to pay off a debt. He assessed himself as having reached a "pretty good level" in the language. however, he himself admitted he had failed to achieve his goal of achieving fluency in his 3 months of learning, partly because of its case system.

Brazilian Portuguese (2009) 
In September 2009, Lewis announced that his next language mission was to spend three months in Brazil. He explained his aim for this mission as follows:
"I want several Brazilians to have believed that not only am I speaking Portuguese as good as a native, but that I actually am a native." Before starting this mission Lewis had 8 months exposure to Portuguese, having lived in Brazil previously.

At the end of this project December 2009, Lewis stated that the mission had been a "partial success" with some Brazilians believing he was a native speaker for periods of up to 30 seconds. At one point he was put in police cell for being cheeky to a Brazilian policewoman.

German (2010) 
In 2010, Lewis announced that he planned to learn German to the level of "mastery" within a period of three months. He explained the mission as follows:

Prior to starting this mission, he had studied German for five years at school. He stated that those years of study had been "wasted", and that after all that time he still could not speak German.

At the end of the three-month project, Benny shared the results of the Goethe-Zertifikat C2: Zentrale Oberstufenprüfung examination. He stated that he was "very pleased" with the results adding that he had "passed" four out of the five elements of the exam. He failed the element on listening comprehension.

Chinese (2012) 
Lewis made attempts at learning both Japanese and Chinese to levels of fluency in the space of three months. He admitted he found these the most difficult languages he had attempted to learn and only partially achieved the goals he set himself for these languages. That said, he did achieve some success in learning these languages.

Lewis announced in January 2012 that he would undertake a project to learn Mandarin to fluency, specifically stating a goal to attain C1 level in the European Language level Framework in the space of three months. 
After endeavouring to learn the language, he was assessed by a Chinese language teacher after 5 months (28 May 2012) who assessed his ability in detail, stating that his spoken ability was "very impressive", however he was assessed at a B1:lower intermediate level, below what he had desired to achieve. His listening skills were assessed as "very good". His reading and writing abilities were assessed to be at a level below B1 and after 5 months, and overall, he failed to achieve the level of fluency (C1 Level) he had stated he was aiming for at the start of the "mission".

Following the challenge Lewis reflected that his unfamiliarity with the norms of Taiwanese social interaction had made learning Mandarin using his methods more challenging than languages he had previously studied.

Japanese (2013) 
In 2013 Lewis announced that he would attempt to learn Japanese to the level of fluency (N2 level the second highest level in the Japanese-Language Proficiency Test), in the space of three months. This was met with some skepticism by fellow polyglots/language bloggers including fellow hyperpolyglot Steve Kaufmann, who said it was not possible to achieve fluency in Japanese in that period of time. After starting the project, Lewis initially pushed the deadline for achieving fluency back by two weeks, then ultimately stopped the project after failing to achieve fluency, achieving a basic level of Japanese.

Awards 
Lewis was awarded a "Language Ambassador of the Year" award in 2012. He was named National Geographic Traveler of the Year in 2013.

Publications

References

External links 

Living people
Year of birth missing (living people)
Irish bloggers